Brigadier Leslie Potter  (13 September 1894 – 7 March 1964) was an officer of the New Zealand Military Forces who served in both the First and Second World Wars.

Early life

Leslie Potter was born on 13 September 1894 in Auckland, New Zealand. He attended Auckland Grammar School and became captain of the school shooting team in 1911.

Military career

First World War

Potter entered the Royal Military College, Duntroon in 1913 and graduated in 1915. He sailed overseas with the 16th Reinforcements and joined 2nd Battalion, Otago Regiment on the Western Front. He was wounded at the Battle of Messines in 1917 and later became a staff officer of the 3rd (New Zealand Rifle) Brigade.

Interbellum

Following the First World War, Potter would continue as a territorial officer in the Auckland Regiment. He went on exchange with the Highland Light Infantry in India from 1926 to 1928 and would later hold a number of staff appointments in New Zealand.

Second World War

At the outbreak of war Potter held the position of G.S.O.1, Northern Command and in 1940 was appointed commander of the Central Field Force. In December 1941, 14th Brigade was raised for service in the Pacific and Potter was appointed as its commander. 14th Brigade was initially assigned to occupation duties in Fiji, but would eventually see combat in September and October 1943 at the Battle of Vella Lavella and in February 1944 at the Battle of the Green Islands. After the disbandment of 14th Brigade in 1944, Potter would return to New Zealand and was appointed District Commandant of the Central Military District.

Post war

Potter took over command of J Force, the New Zealand occupation force in Japan, on 6 July 1946 and retained command (except for a period of leave 10 June – 23 September 1947) until the withdrawal of the New Zealand forces in 1948.

Later life

Potter retired to Tauranga in the 1950s. He died on 7 March 1964, and was buried at the Tauranga Anglican Cemetery.

Honours and awards
Potter was appointed a Companion of the Distinguished Service Order on 31 August 1944, for his actions commanding 14th Brigade. The citation reads:

Potter was made a Commander of the British Empire in the 1947 King's Birthday Honours.

Notes

References

1894 births
1964 deaths
People educated at Auckland Grammar School
Royal Military College, Duntroon graduates
New Zealand Companions of the Distinguished Service Order
New Zealand brigadiers
People from Auckland
New Zealand Military Forces personnel of World War I
New Zealand military personnel of World War II